Moussa Ndiaye (born 30 September 1999) is a Senegalese footballer who plays as a midfielder for Serie D club Asti.

Club career
He made his Serie B debut for Cesena on 3 March 2018 in a game against Spezia.

On 2 September 2019, he moved from Pescara to Rende.

References

External links
 

1999 births
Living people
Footballers from Dakar
Senegalese footballers
Association football midfielders
Serie B players
Serie C players
Serie D players
Juventus F.C. players
A.C. Cesena players
Delfino Pescara 1936 players
Alma Juventus Fano 1906 players
Rende Calcio 1968 players
Senegalese expatriate footballers
Senegalese expatriate sportspeople in Italy
Expatriate footballers in Italy